Joseph Verdickt (born 30 June 1894, date of death unknown) was a Belgian racing cyclist. He rode in the 1919 Tour de France.

References

1894 births
Year of death missing
Belgian male cyclists
Place of birth missing